Kumud Chandra  Hazarika (born 24 July 1952), popularly known as Ranju Hazarika is an Indian writer. In last four decades he has written over 750 books in Assamese language in different genres like Thriller, Social, Horror, Science Fiction, Children, Comedy, Adventure and considered as one of the most beloved writers of Assam.

Biography

Early life

Ranju Hazarika was born in an Assamese family in Sonitpur, formerly known as the Darrang district of Assam. He spent his childhood in the Monabari Tea Estate. Since childhood he had an inclination towards the literature and that eventually prompted him write few short stories and poems, those were published in some local newspapers and magazines. At the age of fifteen, he finished writing the manuscript of his first Novel Bahurupi, after appearing the Class 10 Board Exams.

First novel and beginning

Along with his studies, Hazarika started his first job as an Accountant in the Cooperative society of the Monabari Tea State. Then, he had the chance to work in NEFA and in the next decade he served as an employee in two different tea estates. During those periods, he made the full utilization of his leisure time and his first novel Bahurupi, that were published in 1973. Gradually, Hazarika started writing few other manuscripts of his famous novels like Klanta Surjyar Rashmi, Sandhan, Mayajaal, Duranta Dashyu, Nikhar Atithi, Eta Dip Satta Kabar, Gahin Banar Phool,  Uttar Phalguni, Tamas Tapashya, Debajani etc. Initially he did not have any intention to publish them and dumped all the manuscripts of his novels in a tea box, which he names "A Dustbin of Stories & Novels of Ranju Hazarika".

Jobs and career as a writer

In 1982, he moved became involved in literature and became the editor of the Assamese Trishool magazine. In 1984, he shifted to Guwahati and joined as an editor in a new magazine named Sangket. Additionally, he started a new children's magazine at his own effort named "Kon Kon", but unfortunately they did not run for a long time. After more than a decade, he again worked as an editor in few famous Assamese magazines like Hiya, Taal and Kareng.

Marriage
In 1984, he shifted to Guwahati and married Pranita Hazarika. They have a daughter and a son.

Other interests
Other than writing novels, Hazarika is famous for writing Short Stories. Thousands of his short stories have been published in many Assamese Magazines like Bismoi, Rahashya, Trishool, Hiya, Mouchaak etc. He has been practicing Astrology since last 35 years, and has written 11 books on Astrology and Palmistry.

Writing

Genres

The versatility of Hazarika's writing extends into many genres and subgenres. For example, his thriller novels can be farther categorized into few subgenres like mystery fiction, crime fiction, psychological thriller, detective thriller, socio-crime, legal thriller, comic thriller and romantic thriller, have the interesting components like abrupt changes, exhilarate feeling, dramatic traction, strong narration and use of active voices. In terms of his social novels, his perception and critic to the society, the humor and undeviating depiction, the narration of the hypocrisy of the society amuses the reader. His social novels can also be divided into romantic, tragic, family-based, melodrama, etc. Kalnta Surjyar Rashmi, Gahin Banar Phool, Zulu, Jantab, Prahari, Unmukta Aranya, Birohi Aranya are few of his creations, plotting the Forest Life into limelight.   Hazarika can be recognized as one of pioneer writers in the horror genre in the Assamese literature. His expertise in narrating the G, etc. are popular among readers. He has written many novels and books in the Gothic fiction, terror, paranormal, children's, astrology, comedy, science fiction and adventure genres. He has written over 200 children's books.

Series of books

Hazarika has written over 110 books, that came in a series, popularly known as the Series of Books. Till now, he has written all those books into 11 group of series popularly known as Jason Series (24 books), Pawan Series (18 books), Nandan Series (7 books), Rohan Series (10 books), Jintan Series (7 books), Gun Fighter Series (3 books), Jitu Series (13 books), Ranjan Series (7 books), Valkan Series (14 books), Keron Series (3 books) and Trinayan Series (7 books). Few of characters from the series like Jason, Pawan, Nandan, Rohan, Jintan, Jitu, Ranjan, Valkan, Keron, Trinayan were very popular among the readers.

Autobiography

Hazarika wrote his Autobiography in two parts. The first part was Jibanar Phool Aru Kaint (Flowers and Thrones of Life) and the second part was Jibanar Saat Rang (Seven Colors of Life).

Real life experiences

As mentioned in his Autobiographies, Hazarika claims to have experienced many paranormal activities in his real life. They inspired him to write his first horror story named "Rahashyamayee Haat" (Mysterious Hand), published in Bismoi and other horror stories, and finally wrote his first horror novel named Sesh Rajanigandham (Last Morning), published in 1983.

Story research

Just before writing every novel, Hazarika prefers to make a detailed research about the location and all. Once, few mountaineers followed one of his novel named Mrityur Xital Porox (Cold Touch of Death), where Hazarika explained a detailed scenario about the Great Himalayas and the people who actually visited the Himalayas, confirmed that it was exactly the same that Hazarika mentioned in that novel. Ranju Hazarika never visited any foreign locations, but the way he explains about the scenes in his novels are all seems to be real.

Common characters

Ranju Hazarika induced few of fictional characters in many of his novels and those popular characters are Detective Debajit Phukan, Pabitra Lahkar, Scientist Amal Krishna Hazarika, Agent Ranjit, Agent Arindom etc.

Awards

 Rahashya Samrat, 2008.
 Prerana Bota, 2008.
 Literary Award, 2011.

Movies, plays and serials made based on his novels

Plays

So far, 11 of Hazarika's novels were performed as plays by mobile theater groups like Theater Bhagyadevi, Bordoisila Theatre, Pragjyotish Theartre, Hengul Theatre etc.  .

Movies

Ranju Hazarika's novel Zulu was published as 3D animated feature film in 2012. Aasene Kunuba Hiyat (2000) and Maya (2003) were two movies in Assamese language, based on his novels Uttar Phalguni and Narakar Phool respectively. Hazarika was appointed as the brand ambassador of the film Boroshi.

Rahashyar Bitchaku

In 2014, Film Division of India produced a documentary Rahashyar Bitchaku, based on his life of Ranju Hazarika, directed by Altaf Mazid. The documentary later received a "Golden Conch" international award.

Serials

A number of serials were made from his novels, telecast in Doordarshan and famous Prahelika Series in DY 365.

References

1952 births
Living people
People from Sonitpur district
Assamese-language writers
Indian male novelists
Novelists from Assam
20th-century Indian novelists
Indian children's writers
Indian horror writers
Screenwriters from Assam
Indian television writers
20th-century Indian male writers
Male television writers